GRB 830801 is a gamma-ray burst that occurred on 1983 August 1. It is by far the all-time brightest GRB event known.

It had a peak flux of 3.0 photons·cm−2·s−1·keV−1 averaged from 50 to 300 keV, a dead time correction by a factor of 1.9, and a smooth light curve for the peak 256 ms time interval.
The peak flux P256 was around 1400 photons·s−1·cm−2.

This was also the first detection of the influence of a gamma burst on the upper atmosphere.

Sources
 Time structure of the powerful event GRB 830801 http://adsabs.harvard.edu/full/1987SvAL...13..444K

References

830801
Astronomical objects discovered in 1983
August 1983 events